Strikes and Spares is a 1934 American short sports film directed by Felix E. Feist and starring Pete Smith and Andy Varipapa. In 1934, it was nominated for an Academy Award for Best Short Subject (Novelty) at the 7th Academy Awards.

Cast
 Pete Smith as narrator (voice)
 Andy Varipapa as himself - World's Greatest Bowling Fixture
 Buster Brodie as Little Bald-Headed Man (uncredited)
 Ray Turner as Pin Boy (uncredited)

References

External links

1934 films
1934 short films
Ten-pin bowling films
American black-and-white films
Films produced by Pete Smith (film producer)
Films directed by Felix E. Feist
Metro-Goldwyn-Mayer short films
American sports documentary films
1930s sports films
1930s English-language films
1930s American films